Avast is a Czech technology and internet security company.

Avast may  refer to:

Avast, a nautical term meaning "stop" or "cease"
Avast! Recording Company, a music recording studio in Seattle, Washington
Avast!, a trademarked name for the herbicide fluridone